Mniotype deluccai is a moth of the family Noctuidae. Emilio Berio first used the scientific name in 1976. It is found on Malta.

References

 "Mniotype deluccai (Berio, 1976)". Insecta.pro. Retrieved February 5, 2020.

Moths described in 1976
Cuculliinae
Moths of Europe